The Pčinja (Serbian and Macedonian Пчиња ) is a 135 km long river in Serbia and North Macedonia, a left tributary of the Vardar river.

Serbia 
The Pčinja originates from several streams on the western slopes of the Dukat mountain which meet at the village of Radovnica and continue to the west originally under the name of the Tripušnica (Cyrillic: Трипушница). The river creates a micro-region of Pčinja, with center being the municipal seat of Trgovište where Tripušnica meets the left tributary of Lesnička reka (Cyrillic: Лесничка река) from the south and continues to the west under the name of Pčinja. The region represents one of the fastest depopulating and economically least developed parts of Serbia (population of 12,556 in 1971 (34 per km2) and 6,372 in 2002 (17 per km2; down 50%). After the Pčinja passes next to the northern side of the mountain of Široka planina and the village of Šajince where it receives the right tributary of Koćurica (Cyrillic: Коћурица) from the north, it is prevented to continue to the west by the eastern side of the Rujen mountain and turns south, into the narrow valley between the Rujen and Kozjak mountains. The small village and monastery of Prohor Pčinjski are located in the valley. Just after the river passes next to the monastery, after 52 km of flow in Serbia, the Pčinja crosses the Macedonian border.

North Macedonia 
For the remaining 83 km, the river bends gently to the southwest. It passes next to the villages of Karlovce, Dragomance, Strnovac, Vojnik, Klečevce, Pčinja, Studena Bara, Gorno Konjare, Dolno Konjare and the small town of Katlanovo, with the neighboring Katlanovska Banja, the most popular spa in North Macedonia. The upper course in North Macedonia creates a micro-region of Sredorek (Macedonian: Средорек), and the lower a micro-region of Kotorci (Macedonian: Которци), with the gorge of Bader (Macedonian: Бадерска клисура) in between. In the lower course, the Pčinja follows the western side of the mountain Gradištanska and flows into the Vardar river, on the gorge of Taor section of the Vardar's course, halfway between the cities of Skopje and Veles.

Katlanovo is located on the highway Skopje-Thessaloniki, and even though some 25 km away from Skopje, a string of Skopje's fast growing suburbs is located along the highway (Jurumleri, Idrizovo, Petrovec), and if the city continues to grow, in some future it will reach Katlanovo and the banks of Pčinja.

Characteristics 
The Pčinja belongs to the Aegean sea drainage basin. Its own drainage area covers 3.140 km2, of that 1.247 km2 in Serbia and 1.893 km2 in North Macedonia.
The average discharge on the river's mouth into the Vardar is 14 m³/s, and it is not navigable.
All the major tributaries of the Pčinja are in North Macedonia: Bistrica, Petroshnica and Kriva Reka from the left; Kumanovska reka, from the right.

Gallery

See also 
 PIM "Ivan Milutinović", Belgrade, Serbia ; Morava - Vardar (Axios) Navigation Route  (About 1,200 km shorter route (three days shorter time of navigation) from Belgrade to Port of Thessaloniki than across Danube, Black Sea and Aegean Sea. Electric power production, improvement of water quality and regulation of flooding wave.)
 Morava - Vardar (Axios) Navigation Route map
 Hydropower and navigation system "Morava"  (Concepts of regulation of rivers Great Morava and South Morava for navigation and hydropower production.)

References 

 Mala Prosvetina Enciklopedija, Third edition (1985); Prosveta; 
 Jovan Đ. Marković (1990): Enciklopedijski geografski leksikon Jugoslavije; Svjetlost-Sarajevo; 

Rivers of Serbia
Rivers of North Macedonia